Lawrence D. Wright, III (born September 6, 1973) is an American former college and professional football player who was a safety in the National Football League (NFL) for two seasons during the 1990s.  Wright played college football for the University of Florida, where he was a member of a national championship team.  Thereafter, he played professionally for the Cincinnati Bengals of the NFL.

Early years 

Wright was born in Miami, Florida in 1973.  He attended North Miami High School and Valley Forge Military Academy in Wayne, Pennsylvania.

College career 

Wright accepted an athletic scholarship to attend the University of Florida in Gainesville, Florida, where he played for coach Steve Spurrier's Florida Gators football team from 1993 to 1996.  He led the Gators with 109 tackles as a junior in 1995.  During Wright's senior season in 1996, Wright was one of the team captains and the Gators posted a 12–1 record and won the 1996 Bowl Alliance national championship by defeating the top-ranked Florida State Seminoles 52–20 in the 1997 Sugar Bowl.  That same year, he also won the Jim Thorpe Award, recognizing the best defensive back in college football, and was a first-team All-Southeastern Conference (SEC) selection in 1995 and 1996.  He finished his Gator career with 331 tackles, five interceptions, eight forced fumbles and four fumbles recoveries.

Wright was named to the SEC Academic Honor Roll for four consecutive years, and was a CFA Scholar-Athlete in 1996.  He graduated from Florida with a bachelor's degree in building construction in 1997, and was inducted into the University of Florida Athletic Hall of Fame as a "Gator Great" in 2007.

Gators fans also remember Wright for leading the cheer "If you ain't a Gator, you must be Gator bait!" during a large celebration at Florida Field following Florida's 1996 national championship.  As an alumnus, he returned to Gainesville to lead the same cheer during celebrations after the Gators' national championships in 2006 and 2008

Professional career 

Wright was undrafted in the 1997 NFL Draft, but was signed by the Cincinnati Bengals as a free agent.

Life after football 

After retiring from professional football, Wright formed a construction and real estate development company, Wright & Partners, in South Florida.

See also
 History of the Cincinnati Bengals
 List of University of Florida alumni
 List of University of Florida Athletic Hall of Fame members

References

Bibliography 

 Carlson, Norm, University of Florida Football Vault: The History of the Florida Gators, Whitman Publishing, LLC, Atlanta, Georgia (2007).  .
 Golenbock, Peter, Go Gators!  An Oral History of Florida's Pursuit of Gridiron Glory, Legends Publishing, LLC, St. Petersburg, Florida (2002).  .
 Hairston, Jack, Tales from the Gator Swamp: A Collection of the Greatest Gator Stories Ever Told, Sports Publishing, LLC, Champaign, Illinois (2002).  .
 McCarthy, Kevin M.,  Fightin' Gators: A History of University of Florida Football, Arcadia Publishing, Mount Pleasant, South Carolina (2000).  .
 Nash, Noel, ed., The Gainesville Sun Presents The Greatest Moments in Florida Gators Football, Sports Publishing, Inc., Champaign, Illinois (1998).  .

1973 births
Living people
American football defensive backs
Cincinnati Bengals players
Florida Gators football players
Players of American football from Miami
North Miami Senior High School alumni
Valley Forge Military Academy Trojans football players